Piazza del Campo is the main public space of the historic center of Siena, Tuscany, Italy and is regarded as one of Europe's greatest medieval squares. It is renowned worldwide for its beauty and architectural integrity. The Palazzo Pubblico and its Torre del Mangia, as well as various palazzi signorili surround the shell-shaped piazza. At the northwest edge is the Fonte Gaia.

The twice-a-year horse-race, Palio di Siena, is held around the edges of the piazza. The piazza is also the finish of the annual road cycling race Strade Bianche.

History 

The open site was a marketplace established before the thirteenth century on a sloping site near the meeting point of the three hillside communities that coalesced to form Siena: the Castellare, the San Martino and the Camollia. Siena may have had earlier Etruscan settlements, but it was not a considerable Roman settlement, and the campo does not lie on the site of a Roman forum, as is sometimes suggested. It was paved in 1349 in fishbone-patterned red brick with 8 lines of travertine, which divide the piazza into 9 sections, radiating from the mouth of the gavinone (the central water drain) in front of the Palazzo Pubblico. The number of divisions is held to be symbolic of the rule of The Nine (Noveschi) who laid out the campo and governed Siena at the height of its mediaeval splendour between 1292-1355. The Campo was and remains the focal point of public life in the City.  From the piazza, eleven narrow shaded streets radiate into the city.

The palazzi signorili that line the square, housing the families of the Sansedoni, the Piccolomini and the Saracini etc., have unified rooflines, in contrast to earlier tower houses — emblems of communal strife — such as may still be seen not far from Siena at San Gimignano. In the statutes of Siena, civic and architectural decorum was ordered :"...it responds to the beauty of the city of Siena and to the satisfaction of almost all people of the same city that any edifices that are to be made anew anywhere along the public thoroughfares...proceed in line with the existent buildings and one building not stand out beyond another, but they shall be disposed and arranged equally so as to be of the greatest beauty for the city."

The unity of these Late Gothic houses is affected in part by the uniformity of the bricks of which their walls are built: brick-making was a monopoly of the commune, which saw to it that standards were maintained.

At the foot of the Palazzo Pubblico's wall is the late Gothic Chapel of the Virgin built as an ex voto by the Sienese, after the terrible Black Death of 1348 had ended.

Fonte Gaia 

The Fonte Gaia ("Joyous Fountain") was built in 1419 as an endpoint of the system of conduits bringing water to the city's centre, replacing an earlier fountain completed about 1342 when the water conduits were completed. Under the direction of the Committee of Nine, many miles of tunnels were constructed to bring water in aqueducts to fountains and thence to drain to the surrounding fields. The present fountain, a center of attraction for the many tourists, is in the shape of a rectangular basin that is adorned on three sides with many bas-reliefs with the Madonna surrounded by the Classical and the Christian Virtues, emblematic of Good Government under the patronage of the Madonna. The white marble  Fonte Gaia was originally designed and built by Jacopo della Quercia, whose bas-reliefs from the basin's sides are conserved in the Ospedale di St. Maria della Scala in Piazza Duomo. The former sculptures were replaced in 1866 by free copies by Tito Sarrocchi, who omitted Jacopo della Quercia's two nude statues of Rhea Silvia and Acca Larentia, which the nineteenth-century city fathers found too pagan or too nude. When they were set up in 1419, Jacopo della Quercia's nude figures were the first two female nudes, who were neither Eve nor a repentant saint, to stand in a public place since Antiquity.

Notes

External links

Buildings and structures in Siena
Campo, Piazza del
Tourist attractions in Tuscany